Solanum catilliflorum is an evergreen vine in the family Solanaceae. It is endemic to Peru, and is a close relative of Solanum muricatum, the domesticated pepino. It bears small, dish-shaped flowers (thus named catilli-florum: Latin for "dish" and "flower") and is self-compatible and autogamous, with short styles like those that characterize all self-compatible species in this group. It also has a low pollen:ovule ratio, which is characteristic of self-compatible species in the group. It is diploid at n  =  12. Together with Solanum perlongistylum, it might be an allopatric variant of S. caripense.

References

catilliflorum
Flora of Peru